The Sormitz is a tributary or affluent of the Loquitz in Thuringia, Germany and is 29.2 km in length.

Its origin is in the town park of Wurzbach where Langwasser and Oßlabach confluence.
It enters the Loquitz in Hockeroda, which is in turn a tributary of the Saale.

Naming 
It is not possible to clarify to origin of the name. One assumption is the origin in Slavic Sb'rbica bzw. Sb'rbici (what means Sorbian stream).

See also
List of rivers of Thuringia

References

Rivers of Thuringia
Rivers of Germany